Scott Wallace Stucky (born January 11, 1948) is a Senior Judge of the United States Court of Appeals for the Armed Forces. His term as a judge began on December 20, 2006, and expired on July 31, 2021.

Education 

Stucky graduated from Pretty Prairie Rural High School in Kansas in 1966. He then earned a Bachelor of Arts in history with Omicron Delta Kappa honors in 1970 from Wichita State University where he received a commission as a second lieutenant, U.S. Air Force Reserve, through ROTC. He earned his Juris Doctor from Harvard Law School in 1973. In addition to his undergraduate and legal degrees, Stucky holds master's degrees in history from Trinity University and in international law from the George Washington University Law School.

Legal and judicial career 

Stucky served as an Air Force judge advocate on active duty from 1973 to 1978. He was legislative counsel and principal legislative counsel to the Department of the Air Force from 1983 to 1996, where he worked on such legislation as the Goldwater-Nichols Act and legislative responses to the First Gulf War. From 1996 to 2006, he served as general counsel and minority counsel to the Senate Committee on Armed Services.  He was appointed to the Court by President George W. Bush on December 20, 2006.  Stucky is a retired colonel in the Air Force Reserve, and was awarded the Legion of Merit for outstanding service upon his retirement in 2003. His judicial term ended on July 31, 2021, and he assumed senior status thereafter.

References

1948 births
Living people
People from Hutchinson, Kansas
Wichita State University alumni
Harvard Law School alumni
Trinity University (Texas) alumni
George Washington University Law School alumni
Recipients of the Meritorious Service Medal (United States)
United States Air Force colonels
Recipients of the Legion of Merit
Judges of the United States Court of Appeals for the Armed Forces
United States Article I federal judges appointed by George W. Bush
21st-century American judges